The Canadian Press Team of the Year Award is an annual award given to Canada's team of the year. The sports writers of the Canadian Press (CP) conduct a poll to determine the nation's top team of either gender.

Winners

See also

Lou Marsh Award
Lionel Conacher Award
Bobbie Rosenfeld Award
Velma Springstead Trophy

References

Canadian sports trophies and awards